Hexaplex kuesterianus is a species of sea snail, a marine gastropod mollusk in the family Muricidae, the murex snails or rock snails.

Subspecies
 Hexaplex kuesterianus blazeki T. Cossignani, 2017
 Hexaplex kuesterianus bozzadamii (Franchi, 1990)
 Hexaplex kuesterianus kuesterianus (Tapparone-Canefri, 1875)

Description

Distribution

References

 Adams A. (1853). Description of several new species of Murex, Rissoina, Planaxis and Eulima from the Comingian collection. Proc. Zool. Soc. Lond. 1851 p. 267–272
 Tapparone Canefri, C. (1875). Studio monografico sopra i Muricidi del mar Rosso. Annali del Museo Civico di Storia Naturale di Genova. 7: 569-640, pl. 19.
 Merle D., Garrigues B. & Pointier J.-P. (2011) Fossil and Recent Muricidae of the world. Part Muricinae. Hackenheim: Conchbooks. 648 pp.

External links
 Adams A. (1853 ["1851"). Descriptions of several new species of Murex, Rissoina, Planaxis, and Eulima, from the Cumingian collection. Proceedings of the Zoological Society of London. (1851): 267-272.]

Muricidae
Gastropods described in 1875